7th Legion may refer to:

7th Legion (video game)
Legio VII Claudia,  a legion of the Imperial Roman army founded in Spain in 65 BC
Legio VII Gemina, a legion of the Imperial Roman army founded in AD 68 in Spain
7th Legions' Infantry Regiment, an infantry regiment in the interwar Polish army
Sétima Legião, a Portuguese rock band named after the Roman Seventh Legion